A transfer allows the rider of a public transportation vehicle who pays for a single-trip fare to continue the trip on another bus or train. Depending on the network, there may or may not be an additional fee for the transfer. Historically, transfers may have been stamped or hole-punched with the time, date, and direction of travel to prevent their use for a return trip. More recently, magnetic or barcoded tickets may be recorded (as on international flights) or ticket barriers may only charge on entry and exit to a larger system (as on modern underground rail networks). 

Fare cards vastly simplify transfers, especially between different operators, since the transfer and payment (if any) is handled automatically by the card. Since transfers between services can significantly expand the effective range and coverage of another service, fare cards are often implemented specifically to improve a transit network's quality.

References

Public transport fare collection